Porphyra purpurea is a medium sized marine algae in the Division Rhodophyta.

Description
This red algae consists of a single membranous layer of cells forming a blade attached by a disk holdfast. It grows to a length of 20 to 50 cm long. The blade has the texture of a thin polythene sheet.

Habitat
Littoral, growing on rock, pebbles, limpets and barnacles.

Distribution
Recorded from Canada and Europe. Common in Great Britain, Ireland and Isle of Man.

References

Bangiophyceae